Urocortin III is a 38 amino acid peptide that is a member of the CRF family of peptides. Unlike Urocortin I, and similar to Urocortin II, Urocortin III is highly selective for the CRF2 receptor and does not show affinity for the CRF binding protein.

Urocortin II has been shown to have anorexigenic effects and hypotensive effects similar to Urocortin, but does not induce secretion of ACTH.

Peptide hormones

.